Wang Jinxi or Wang Chin-hsi (8 October 1923 – 15 November 1970) was a Chinese model worker and socialist hero known as 'Iron man' Wang, who led No. 1205 drilling team at Daqing Oil Field. He was the subject of a 1964 documentary Tieren, "Iron Man".

In 1974, Wang's life was made into a feature film The Pioneers[/Start An Undertaking] (创业). Zhang Lianwen played the starring role of Zhou Tingshan, modelled after Wang Jinxi.

Biography

Early life
Wang Jinxi was born on 1923 to a poor peasant family in Yumen City, Gansu Province. As a child, he worked as a shepherd and later as a coal bearer. Later, he started working as an apprentice in an oil field in Yumen. Following the founding of the People's Republic of China in 1949, he was assigned to No. 1205 Drilling Team at the oil field. On 1950, Yumen oil field recruited workers, and Wang Jinxi passed the exam to become one of the first generation of oil drilling workers in the People's Republic of China.

Career in oil industry

 
In 1956, he joined the Chinese Communist Party. On the same year, he became the captain of the predecessor of Brigade No. 1205 and successfully led the completion of the drilling rig in Yumen oil field. Following the start of Great Leap Forward in 1958, he led a team to drill 5009.3 meters per month, which was then the highest record in mainland China at that time. In October, he was awarded the 'Red Flag' award by the Ministry of Petroleum Industry. In 1958, during the ceremonies for the 10th anniversary of the founding of the People's Republic of China, he met with Chairman Mao Zedong and participated in an elite meeting between industrial and communication ministries. 
 
In 1960, Mao Zedong and Party Central Committee issued a declaration "to fight 'a massive battle' to open up Daqing" and become self-sufficient in oil. On April, Wang and his No. 1205 Drilling Team rushed to the bleak grasslands from Yumen Oil field. Undeterred by temperatures of between -20 and -30 Celsius, they continued to work on. Despite fatigue, injuries and difficulties, Wang kept going throughout. He and 30 others manually carried 60 tonnes of equipment from a railway station to the oil field. They broke the ice of a nearby pond and fetched water to cool the drill. In five days, they transported more than 50 tonnes of water. After five days of drilling, they struck oil, and Daqing's first production well went into operation. Within three years, Daqing became China's first-rate big oilfield.

Wang Jinxi participated in a 10,000-person inauguration ceremony of the oil field, during the international Labor Day. During the ceremony, he shouted the slogan:

"I would give up 20 years of life so China can produce oil on its own land."

During the work, he said to his co-workers:

"We have to do everything possible. And we have to make the impossible possible."

For this the people called him 'Iron Man' (“铁人”), and the name 'Iron Man' Wang stuck and spread. In 1960, the nation was called upon to learn from the 'Iron Man', and he was appointed as the captain of the Drilling Command and Construction Brigade. The oil workers' exploits were depicted in the play The Rising Sun, by Sun Weishi. The plot of the Rising Sun focused on the contributions that women made in agriculture and the construction of oilfields, and featured a cast made up exclusively of local people. The play was well received in Daqing, Beijing, and Shandong and also was the first time in the history of New Chinese drama that experts and the public collaborated to create the art.

In February 1961, Wang Jinxi was assigned as the captain of the second production team of the Drilling Command. On 1964, he was elected deputy to the 3rd National People's Congress. On December 26, while attending the 71st birthday party of Chairman Mao Zedong, Wang was praised by Mao, who called him an "industrial leader."

On 1965, Wang was appointed the member of the Standing Committee of the Drilling Party Committee and Deputy Commander of the Drilling Command of the CCP Daqing Committee. On July 24, he joined the Ministry of Petroleum Industry and put forward for the first time, the goal of "half a ton of oil per person in the country". On 1966, he was appointed as the deputy commander of the Daqing Petroleum Campaign Command by the State Council of the People's Republic of China. He was awarded as one of the 'Five Good Models of the Ministry of Petroleum Industry'. On June 4, he was part of the Chinese delegation that visited People's Republic of Albania.

Cultural Revolution and persecution

Following the start of the Cultural Revolution in 1966, Wang was condemned as a supporter of Liu Shaoqi and lost his positions within the Petroleum Ministry. He was mocked at rallies and tortured by the Red Guards, which almost cost him his life.

In April 1968, he was the deputy director of the Drilling Revolutionary Committee. In the same year, he was appointed to the Daqing Revolutionary Committee.

Final years and death
In 1969, he worked as the deputy leader of the core group of the CCP Daqing Committee. In April, he participated in the 9th National Congress of the Communist Party of China and was elected as a member of the presidium and a member of the Central Committee of the Communist Party of China. In April, he went to Yumen to participate in a work conference regarding the petroleum industry.

On April 19, 1970, Wang was diagnosed with stomach cancer. He was admitted to the 301 Hospital in Beijing for treatment. His final public appearance was on October 1, when he was at the Tiananmen Gate Tower for National Day inspection.

Wang Jinxi died on November 15, 1970, at the age of 47. On November 18, a farewell ceremony was held for him, and his remains were interred at the Babaoshan Revolutionary Cemetery in Beijing.

Personal life
Wang Jinxi and his wife Wang Lanying had raised two sons and three daughters. His eldest son served as the party secretary of the Underground Resources Development Company of Daqing Oil Field Drilling Engineering Company.

Memorials

See also
 Lei Feng
 Dong Cunrui
 List of campaigns of the Communist Party of China
 Zhang Side

References

1923 births
1970 deaths
People from Daqing
People from Jiuquan
Deaths from stomach cancer
Deaths from cancer in the People's Republic of China
Victims of the Cultural Revolution
Members of the 9th Central Committee of the Chinese Communist Party
Burials at Babaoshan Revolutionary Cemetery
Chinese communists